The 2013 Senior League World Series took place from August 11–17 in Bangor, Maine, United States. Chitré, Panama defeated Kennett Square, Pennsylvania in the championship game.

Teams

Results

Group A

Group B

Elimination Round

References

Senior League World Series
Senior League World Series
2013 in sports in Maine